is a railway station on the West Japan Railway Company JR Kyoto Line (Tōkaidō Main Line between Kyoto and Osaka) in Suita, Osaka Prefecture, Japan. Though this station is administrated by Takatsuki Station, the regional station master exists at this station and administrates Kishibe Station.

History
The station opened on 9 August 1876.

Station numbering was introduced to the station in March 2018 with Suita being assigned station number JR-A44.

Layout
The station has two island platforms, each of which exclusively serves up or down trains. The outer side of each platform is fenced as all trains on the outer tracks pass through the station without stopping.

Adjacent stations

References

Railway stations in Japan opened in 1876
Railway stations in Osaka Prefecture
Tōkaidō Main Line